The 1860 United States presidential election in New York took place on November 6, 1860, as part of the 1860 United States presidential election. Voters chose 35 electors of the Electoral College, who voted for president and vice president. New York was the tipping state in this election, and had Lincoln lost it there would have been a contingent election decided by Congress.

New York was won by Republican candidate Abraham Lincoln, who defeated the Democratic fusion ticket. 

Lincoln won New York by a margin of 7.42%.

New York in the election was one of the 4 states that had a fusion ticket for the Democratic Party. The other three states were New Jersey, Pennsylvania and Rhode Island.

Results

Results by County

See also
 United States presidential elections in New York

Notes

References

1860 New York (state) elections
1860
New York